The Glebewood Village Historic District is a national historic district located at Arlington County, Virginia. It contains 105 contributing buildings in a residential neighborhood in northern Arlington. It was built between 1937 and 1938, and consists of seven individual blocks of Colonial Revival-style rowhouses.  Each block consists of between 2 and 39 single rowhouse dwellings.  Each rowhouse is two stories in height, two bays wide, of brick construction and capped with an asymmetrical side-gabled roof.

It was listed on the National Register of Historic Places in 2004.

References

Residential buildings on the National Register of Historic Places in Virginia
Colonial Revival architecture in Virginia
Historic districts in Arlington County, Virginia
National Register of Historic Places in Arlington County, Virginia
Historic districts on the National Register of Historic Places in Virginia